The European Union (EU) and the North Atlantic Treaty Organisation (NATO) are two main treaty-based Western organisations for cooperation between member states, both headquartered in Brussels, Belgium. Their natures are different and they operate in different spheres: NATO is a purely intergovernmental organisation functioning as a military alliance whose primary task is to implement article 5 in the North Atlantic Treaty on collective territorial defence. The EU on the other hand is a partly supranational and partly intergovernmental sui generis entity akin to a confederation that entails wider economic and political integration. Unlike NATO, the EU pursues a foreign policy in its own right—based on consensus, and member states have equipped it with tools in the field of defence and crisis management; the Common Security and Defence Policy (CSDP) structure.

The memberships of the EU and NATO are distinct, and some EU member states are traditionally neutral on defence issues. The EU and NATO have respectively 27 and 30 member states, of which 21 are members of both. Another four NATO members are EU applicants—Albania, Montenegro, North Macedonia, and Turkey—and another one, the United Kingdom, is a former EU member. Iceland and Norway have opted to remain outside of the EU, but do participate in the European Single Market as part of their European Economic Area (EEA) membership. EU members Finland and Sweden have applied to NATO and are being ratified as members, leaving four non-NATO states in the EU: Austria, Cyprus, Ireland, and Malta. Several EU and NATO member states were formerly members of the Warsaw Pact.

The EU has its own mutual defence clause in Articles 42(7) and 222 of the Treaty on European Union (TEU) and the Treaty on the Functioning of the European Union (TFEU), respectively. The CSDP command and control structure is however much smaller than the NATO Command Structure (NCS), and the extent to which the CSDP should evolve to form a full defence arm for the EU that is able to implement the EU mutual defence clause in its own right is a point of contention, and the United Kingdom (UK) has objected to this. At the UK's insistence in the negotiations leading to the Treaty of Lisbon, Article 42.2 of TEU also specifies that NATO shall be the main forum for the implementation of collective self-defence for EU member states that are also NATO members.

The 2002 Berlin Plus agreement and 2018 Joint Declaration provide for cooperation between the EU and NATO, including that that NCS resources may be used for the conduct of the EU's CSDP missions.

History

1948-1951: Common origins, where NATO cannibalises intra-European initiatives

The Western Union, established to implement the 1948 Treaty of Brussels signed by France, the Netherlands, the Benelux countries and the United Kingdom, represents a precursor to both NATO and the EU's defence arm, the Common Security and Defence Policy (CSDP).

1954: Failure to establish an autonomous European pillar in NATO

Had its founding treaty not failed to acquire ratification in the French Parliament in 1954, the European Defence Community would have entailed a pan-European military, divided into national components, and had a common budget, common arms, centralized military procurement, and institutions. The EDC would have had an integral link to NATO, forming an autonomous European pillar in the Atlantic alliance.

1996-present: Tensions and mutual interests as EU gains autonomous defence structures

Following the establishment of the ESDI and the St. Malo declaration, US Secretary of State Madeleine Albright were among others who voiced concern that an independent European security pillar could undermine NATO, as she put forth the three famous D's:

Eastern enlargement

Present cooperation

The Berlin Plus agreement enables EU operations to be planned and conducted at the military strategic and operational level with recourse to assets and capabilities in the NATO Command Structure (NCS). In such an event, an Operational Headquarters (OHQ) would be set up within NATO's Supreme Headquarters Allied Powers Europe (SHAPE) in Mons, Belgium. SHAPE is the main headquarters of Allied Command Operations (ACO).

When the NCS provides the OHQ, the Deputy Supreme Allied Commander Europe (DSACEUR) acts as Operation Commander (OpCdr).

The Berlin Plus agreement requires that the use of NATO assets by the EU is subject to a "right of first refusal", i.e. NATO must first decline to intervene in a given crisis, and contingent on unanimous approval among NATO states, including those outside of the EU. For example, Turkish reservations about Operation Concordia using NATO assets delayed its deployment by more than five months.

The European External Action Service's (EEAS) Military Staff (EUMS), situated in the Kortenberg building in Brussels, has a permanent NATO liaison team and runs a permanent EU cell at NATO's Supreme Headquarters Allied Powers Europe (SHAPE) in Mons.

Comparison

Command structures
The CSDP entails collective self-defence amongst member states. This responsibility is based on Article 42.7 of TEU, which states that this responsibility does not prejudice the specific character of the security and defence policy of certain member states, referring to policies of neutrality. See Neutral country§European Union for discussion on this subject. According to the Article 42.7 "If a Member State is the victim of armed aggression on its territory, the other Member States shall have towards it an obligation of aid and assistance by all the means in their power, in accordance with Article 51 of the United Nations Charter. This shall not prejudice the specific character of the security and defence policy of certain Member States."  Article 42.2 furthermore specifies that NATO shall be the main forum for the implementation of collective self-defence for EU member states that are also NATO members.

The EU does not have a permanent military command structure similar to the North Atlantic Treaty Organization's (NATO) Allied Command Operations (ACO), although it has been agreed that ACO resources may be used for the conduct of the EU's CSDP missions under the Berlin Plus agreement. The Military Planning and Conduct Capability (MPCC), established in 2017 and to be strengthened in 2020, does however represent the EU's first step in developing a permanent military OHQ. In parallel, the newly established European Defence Fund (EDF) marks the first time the EU budget is used to finance multinational defence projects.

European Union

NATO

Summits

EU-NATO Summits
1st EU-NATO Summit: TBD in TBD

Membership

The memberships of the EU and NATO are distinct.  The EU and NATO have respectively 27 and 30 member states, of which 21 states are members of both. 

The six EU member states which are not members of NATO (Austria, Cyprus, Finland, Ireland, Malta and Sweden) held positions of neutrality during the Cold War, which they have since maintained.  However, all but Cyprus are now members of NATO's Partnership for Peace. Cyprus is the only EU member state that is neither a full member of NATO nor participates in the Partnership for Peace. Any treaty concerning Cyprus' participation in NATO would likely be blocked by Turkey because of the Cyprus dispute.  The 2022 Russian invasion of Ukraine reignited debate surrounding NATO membership in several countries, with Sweden and Finland both applying for NATO membership.

Of the 30 NATO member states, 28 are European states.  The 7 European states which are NATO members but not EU members includes four states that have applied for EU membership (Albania, Montenegro, North Macedonia, and Turkey), as well as the United Kingdom which is a former EU member. The two others—Iceland and Norway—have opted to remain outside of the EU, however participate in the EU's single market.

Several EU member states were formerly members of the NATO rival Warsaw Pact.

See also 
Foreign relations of the European Union 
Foreign relations of NATO
United States–European Union relations
Council of Europe–European Union relations
Canada–European Union relations 
Iceland–European Union relations 
Norway–European Union relations
Turkey–European Union relations
United Kingdom–European Union relations 
Austria–NATO relations 
Cyprus–NATO relations 
Finland–NATO relations 
Ireland–NATO relations 
Malta–NATO relations 
Sweden–NATO relations
Brexit
Western European Union
European Union as a potential superpower
Enlargement of the European Union 
Enlargement of NATO
European army
Strategic autonomy

References

External links
NATO article on EU relations
EU factsheets on NATO relations
 EDC Treaty (unofficial translation) see pg 2
 EDC information on European Navigation
 NATO AND THE EUROPEAN UNION: A DEFENSIVE RELATIONSHIP

NATO
Transatlantic relations
NATO relations